Kerri Webster (born 1971) is an American poet. She was a recipient of a 2011 Whiting Award. She currently teaches at Boise State University.

Biography

Kerri Webster was born in 1971 and raised in Idaho. She is the author of four books of poetry and two chapbooks. She received her MFA from Indiana University, and was Writer in Residence in the MFA program at Washington University in St. Louis (2016-2010). For ten years, Webster worked as a Writer in the Schools, conducting weekly creative writing workshops for students. She teaches in the MFA program at Boise State University. Webster’s poems have appeared in numerous journals including American Poet, Antioch Review, At Length, Better, BOAAT, Boston Review, Denver Quarterly, Gettysburg Review, Guernica, Gulf Coast, Indiana Review, Kenyon Review, Poetry, and  Washington Square Review.

Awards
 Whiting Award, 2011
 Iowa Poetry Prize, Jane Mead, judge, 2011 
 Lucille Medwick Award from the Poetry Society of America, Nikky Finney, judge, 2013
 Crazyhorse Lynda Hull Memorial Poetry Prize, Dean Young, judge, 2006
 Idaho Commission on the Arts Fellowships, 2004 and 2016
 Poetry Society Chapbook Fellowship, Carl Phillips, judge, 2003

Publications

Books
 Lapis  Wesleyan University Press, 2022.  
 The Trailhead  Wesleyan University Press, 2018.   
 We Do Not Eat Our Hearts Alone, Athens, Ga: University of Georgia Press, 2005. 
 Grand and Arsenal, Iowa City: University of Iowa Press, 2012.

Chapbooks
 Rowing Through Fog (2003). Winner of the Poetry Society of America Chapbook Fellowship, Published by the Poetry Society of America 
Psalm Project (2009). Published by Albion Books

Reviews  

"Kerri Webster has my favorite living ear. And certainly it’s still one of my favorites when compared to the ears of the dead. But you should read this book [The Trailhead] because the lines buoyed by the ear are so often perfect wonders. “The stranger carves a gold tunnel / through the gold book. The river faces up neon, glows and / glows. I set my glasses by the bed, walk the river path. / Show me the gold tunnel. Show me where the gold tunnel goes,” for example, seems to me as perfect a wonder as poetry allows. How could you not read a book with those lines in it?”—Shane McCrae, author of In the Language of My Captor

"Intuitive forces keep Webster’s poems moving ahead into unexpected but never gratuitous places. She can tweak the tone of a poem effortlessly at just the right moment, and her quirky vision is embodied in the most startling images."—Jane Mead, author of World of Made and Unmade

"With impeccable grace and verve, Webster doubles down on a discomfiting stereotype, claiming it powerfully as a point of view. The book opens its concerns about sexuality and power into ecopoetic and larger ethical meditations."—Cathy Wagner, author of Nervous Device

Elena Karina Byrne said of We Do Not Eat Our Hearts Alone, "With gorgeous maneuvers in language, Webster multiplies image, subject and persona, the way a scientist splits atoms."

Carl Phillips: "Taking on ‘our whole silly empire of sorrow,’ in which the holy is ever vanishing and the body—eager for more than ‘to be entered only metaphorically’—is always trembling, Webster’s poems announce an authentically original voice of astonishing intellectual and formal range, refreshing and disarming in its frankness. The vision here is fierce, intimate, and tireless in its determination to see this life squarely: ‘do the sacred miss the profane?’ Yes, Webster suggests—but if so, then it is also the case that the body is ‘an altar on which you can only lay down so much.’ Webster makes of this dilemma a meditation that ravishes with its sheer nerve and everywhere persuades by its commitment to lyric beauty, intellectual rigor, and to the power—at once rescuing and mutinous—of language itself."

Of Grand and Arsenal, Lisa Russ Spaar wrote: “Obsessed as she was in her first book with time, with fetish and wunderkammer cataloging, with the blur between the sacred and the secular, Webster carries her flood subject matter into new turf in Grand & Arsenal: the political and the erotic, the praised and the indicted, the oracular and the silent.”

Nikky Finney: "Kerri Webster’s voice is oracular, new, and legendary, full of land and weather. Grand and Arsenal rains forth like a liniment, painting the bald-faced human. Her penchant for opposites reminds us that difference is not a contrary thing but first cousin to who we are. When we read this new luminous voice we are led Upriver. This is Big poetry, a very special book where ‘the gods come down to the banks to drink."

References

External links
Author Website
Boise State University MFA
Poetry Foundation, Kerri Webster
Poetry Society of America
NPR National Poetry Month
Slope online journal, Lapsed Hymns
Poetry Society of America Lucile Medwick Memorial Award
Poets.org
Whiting Awards
LA Review of Books
Boise Weekly
At Length, Atomic Clock
The Boston Review Hotel Eidetic,  Hotel Voluptuary,  Hotel Famish
Boaat Press, The Spinster Project,  Of Deborah
Guernica magazine, Corpse Flower
At Length, The Night Grove

1971 births
Living people
21st-century American poets
American women poets
21st-century American women writers
Boise State University faculty
Poets from Idaho
American women academics